Karim Rashid (born 1960) is an Egyptian-born and Canadian raised industrial designer. His designs include luxury goods, furniture, lighting, surface design, brand identity and packaging. Time magazine has described him as the "most famous industrial designer in all the Americas" and the "Prince of Plastic". He is based in New York City, as well as Belgrade, Miami and India.

Early life and education 
Karim Rashid was born in 1960 in Cairo, Egypt to an English mother and Egyptian father, who was an abstract artist. Rashid is the brother of famed architect, Hani Rashid, of Asymptote. His sister is a painter and musician, Soraya Rashid. He was born with the umbilical cord wrapped around his neck and had developmental delays, unable to speak until the age of four. The family emigrated to Missisauga, Ontario, Canada when Karim was five years old. Rashid showed an interest in designed objects from a young age, sketching the luggage he saw on the ship to Canada.

He attended high school in Mimico, Toronto, Ontario, where he further pursued his passion for design and sewed himself a pink satin suit for his graduation. Rashid received a Bachelor of Industrial Design in 1982 from Carleton University in Ottawa, Ontario, Canada. He pursued graduate design studies in Naples, Italy, with Ettore Sottsass. He then moved to Milan for one year and worked at the Rodolfo Bonetto Studio.

Career
Starting in 1984, Rashid worked with KAN Industrial Designers in Canada for 7 years, where he created x-ray equipment and small useful objects, such as a mailbox and a snow shovel. From 1985 until 1991, he co-founded and designed the Babel Fashion Collection and North. In 1993 Rashid opened his own private design studio in New York City.

Rashid's work is featured in 20 permanent collections. His pieces are exhibited in museums worldwide, including the MoMA, Centre Pompidou, and SFMOMA. He is known for designs such as the "Garbo" waste can and "Oh Chair" for home accessories company Umbra, a concept store for Giorgio Armani, perfume bottles for Kenzo, bobble water bottle, watches and tableware for Alessi, lighting for Artemide and Martinelli Luce, and products for Veuve Clicquot. He has also worked with Audi, Samsung, Swarowski and Armani. In addition Rashid has designed for Kenzo, Method, Bombay Saffire, Finé Water Japan, Sexy Beast USA, Davidoff, Issey Miyake, Estee Lauder.  In 1999, he designed manhole covers for the sewers of New York.

While working for Ettore Sottsass, Rashid became dedicated to infusing his pieces with a welcoming "human" quality, finding the majority of industrial designs to be too imposing. Rashid has discussed his interest in the psychological power of objects and spaces, and often works with color palettes which have emotional significance to him; pink, for example, is a staple in his designs as he believes it "creates a sense of well-being, or energy, or of positive spirit," and lime green is used in kitchens as it is "conducive to dining". The mid-century modern influence is evident in Rashid's work, though he prefers to embrace the digital world and look toward the future for inspiration. His style is sometimes described as "sensual minimalism". He was the first designer to participate in the "design burger" "Design Dialogues", a series of visual interviews in which the designer is given a Copic pen and number of written prompts, and responds to these with only drawings.

In 2004, he designed his first hotel, the Semiramis in Athens, Greece.

In 2008, Rashid teamed up with prizeotel Founder & CEO Marco Nussbaum, to become the exclusive Designer for the Economy-Design Hotelbrand.

In 2012, Rashid had a collaboration with artist Terence Koh, for a limited edition of winter coats for the 10th anniversary of the Italian Brand Peuterey.

Rashid was selected in 2014 to design several real estate developments in New York City for HAP Investments, a New York City-based International investment group.

In 2016, it was announced that Rashid is designing the multimillion-dollar makeover of Temptation Resort and Spa, in Cancun Mexico.

Awards 
He holds an honorary doctorate degrees from the OCAD University (formerly Ontario College of Art & Design) in 2006, Pratt Institute in 2014 and Corcoran College of Art & Design in 2005. And in 2016 an honorary doctorate, Doctor of Laws, or honoris causa, from Carleton University. Karim is a frequent guest lecturer at conferences, speaking about the importance of design in everyday life.

In 2012, Danish designer and manufacturer BoConcept collaborated with Rashid to create the Ottawa Collection, which won the Red Dot Design Award. Rashid has won the George Nelson Award in 1999 and the Canadian Designer of the Year award in 2001.

In 2010 Rashid won the Pentawards, a worldwide packaging design awards competition. The award (silver) was won jointly by Box House and Karim Rashid Studio. He is the very first designer to receive this special Pentaward for his creative excellence in packaging design.

In 2017 Rashid was awarded the Lawrence Israel Prize by the Fashion Institute of Technology in New York City.

He is also part of jury panel of Aisa Design Prize in South Korea  and FEEEL Design World Prize in Canada

Personal life
Rashid's first marriage was to digital painter Megan Lang in 1995. The couple later divorced in 2005. He met Lang in 1991 while Rashid was briefly teaching as an assistant professor at Rhode Island School of Design, she was an undergraduate student at the time.

In 2008, Rashid married Ivana Purić, a Serbian chemical engineer. He met Ivana Puric at a party in Belgrade in 2006, while working as an ambassador for the second installment of Belgrade Design Week. Together they have one child, Kiva Rashid born in 2013.

Rashid is known for wearing white or pink clothing.

External links 

 Karim Rashid Official Website

Publications
 2014 Karim Rashid: From the Beginning 
 2013 Karim Rashid - Ideologija ljepote Tihomir Milovac. (in Croatian). Zagreb: Muzej Suvremene Umjetnosti, 2013
 2012  I Protagonisti del Design: Karim Rashid.  Milan: Hachette, 2012
 2012 Sketch: Karim 
 2009 Karim Rashid Space: The Architecture Of Karim Rashid
 2006 Design Your Self: Rethinking the Way You Live, Love, Work, and Play 
 2005 Digipop 
 2004 Karim Rashid: Evolution New York, NY: Universe, 2004. 
 2004 Karim Rashid. San Francisco: * Marisa Bartolucci, Raul Cabra. Karim Rashid. San Francisco: Chronicle Books, 
 2003 International Design Yearbook 18
 2001 I Want to Change the World. New York, NY: Universe Rizzoli, 2001.

References

Living people
1960 births
Canadian people of Egyptian descent
Rhode Island School of Design faculty
Carleton University alumni
American industrial designers
People from Cairo